Neqlan (also Romanized as Neqlān) is a village in Tirchai Rural District, Kandovan District, Meyaneh County, East Azerbaijan Province, Iran. At the 2006 census, its population was 101, in 30 families.

References 

Populated places in Meyaneh County